Justin Bieber: Seasons is a 2020 American YouTube docu-series about Canadian singer Justin Bieber. It details his return to music and his personal struggles, including health issues such as battling Lyme disease, and overcoming mental stress and drug addiction. It is directed and executive produced by OBB Pictures' Michael D. Ratner. The documentary is produced by Bieber Time Films, SB Films, and OBB Pictures, with Bieber serving as an executive producer.

The docu-series broke the all-time record for the most-viewed premiere in its first week of all YouTube Originals to date where its premiere episode titled "Leaving the Spotlight" amassed 32.65 million views within its first week of release surpassing the previous record held by the season 2 premiere of Liza on Demand which had amassed 25.4 million views within its first week of release.

Background
On December 24, 2019, Bieber announced the docu-series. The series is described as an "intimate, in-depth look on his life after releasing his album Purpose". The series includes his wedding ceremony and marriage to Hailey Bieber and also the music and the creation of his fifth studio album Changes.

Promotion
The trailer of the documentary series was released on December 31, 2019. A sneak peek was premiered at Dick Clark's New Year's Rockin' Eve special, with Bieber saying "as humans, we go through so many ups and downs. So many good seasons, bad seasons. Sometimes, we want to give up."

Release
The first four episodes of the series were released on January 27, 2020 on YouTube Premium, with later episodes being released irregularly. For users without a YouTube Premium subscription, two episodes were released per week, starting with the first episode on January 27, 2020.

Episodes

Cast

 Justin Bieber
 Hailey Bieber
 Scooter Braun
 Allison Kaye
 Ryan Good
 Josh Gudwin
 Poo Bear
 Dr. Daniel Amen
 Dr. Erica Lehman
 Dr. Buzz Mingin
 Billie Eilish
 DJ Khaled
 Usher
 Big Sean
 Quavo
 Ariana Grande
 Ricky Guillart
 Ernest Guillart
 Jaden Smith
 Kendall Jenner
 Kylie Jenner
 Kris Jenner
 Auston Matthews
 Mitch Marner
 Tyson Barrie

References

External links
 

Justin Bieber
YouTube Premium original series
Documentary films about singers
Documentary web series
2020 web series debuts
YouTube
American non-fiction web series